Una is a rural locality (a village) in Pertominskoye Rural Settlement of Primorsky District, Arkhangelsk Oblast, Russia. The population was 69 as of 2010.

Geography 
Una is located 151 km west of Arkhangelsk (the district's administrative centre) by road. Luda is the nearest rural locality.

References 

Rural localities in Primorsky District, Arkhangelsk Oblast
Arkhangelsky Uyezd